Townsend House, also known as Lundale Farm, is a historic home located near Pughtown in South Coventry Township, Chester County, Pennsylvania.  It was built in three phases.  The oldest section dates to 1796, with additions made in the early 19th century, and in 1950.  The main house was built in the first two phases and is a -story, five-bay, random fieldstone structure coated in stucco. It has a gable roof and a brick chimney at the west gable end.  The 1950 addition is a -story structure attached at the east end.  Also on the property is a stone springhouse dated to the early 18th century.

The house was added to the National Register of Historic Places in 1974.

Gallery

References

External links
 Lundale Farm, House, State Route 100 (South Coventry Township), Pughtown, Chester County, PA: 1 photo, 2 color transparencies, 6 measured drawings, 12 data pages, and 1 photo caption page at Historic American Buildings Survey

Houses on the National Register of Historic Places in Pennsylvania
Houses completed in 1796
Houses in Chester County, Pennsylvania
National Register of Historic Places in Chester County, Pennsylvania
1796 establishments in Pennsylvania